Kevin Hamilton McDonald (born May 16, 1961) is a Canadian actor, voice actor and comedian. He is a member of the comedy troupe The Kids in the Hall, who have appeared together in a number of stage, television and film productions, most notably the 1988–1995 TV series The Kids in the Hall. He played Pastor Dave in That '70s Show, and also starred as a co-pilot in the 2011 web comedy series Papillon. He also does voice work in animation, most notably for providing the voices of Agent Wendy Pleakley in the Lilo & Stitch franchise, Waffle in Catscratch, and the Almighty Tallest Purple in Invader Zim.

He starred alongside Rodney Dangerfield and Dom DeLuise as the titular character in the gangster parody film The Godson.

Early life

McDonald was born in Montréal, Québec, the son of Sheila and Hamilton "Hammy" McDonald, who was a dental equipment salesman. He moved to Los Angeles, California, at the age of seven, after his father was transferred there. His family subsequently lived in Toronto, Ontario, as well. McDonald has a younger sister, Sandra.

During an interview on WTF with Marc Maron, McDonald discussed his father's severe alcoholism, which inspired the Kids in the Hall sketches "Daddy Drank" and "Girl Drink Drunk." Although he calls his mother "a wonderful woman," she was nevertheless reluctant to leave his father until Kevin turned 19, when his father's drinking had escalated to two bottles of vodka daily. McDonald, his mother and sister rented an apartment, where they quietly moved their belongings "every night [after his father would] collapse on the stairs." Once they had completely moved, his parents divorced, his father lost his job, went bankrupt and lived in a homeless shelter for a year, during which he abstained from drinking (although he alleged "his roommates were drinking Drano"); coincidentally, McDonald would use the same building to rehearse with The Kids in the Hall as they were starting out on stage. His father was able to find employment at a flower shop, then an apartment and, over time, resume his career in dental equipment sales. Eventually, he did drink again, but not to the extent he had earlier in his life. He died of an aneurysm in 2004. McDonald would use his relationship with his father as the basis for a one-man show, Hammy and the Kids, in which he said he had no happy ending to the story of his father. However, during an interview with Marc Maron, he said after one performance of his one-man show, he was approached by a stranger who said that he had served his father as a bartender, and that his father mentioned how proud he was of his son, the famous comedian, which moved McDonald to tears "like the ending to a bad movie."

McDonald briefly studied acting at a community college, where he was kicked out for being "a one-legged actor" (i.e. he could perform comedy, but not drama) by a dean who had a leg amputated, and was therefore a literal one-legged actor. However, one of his professors, William B. Davis (who would later find fame in his portrayal of Cigarette Smoking Man on The X-Files), saw McDonald's potential and encouraged him to pursue improv comedy by giving him the number to The Second City in Toronto.

Career
McDonald founded The Kids in the Hall comedy troupe with his friend Dave Foley. They met in Toronto at the Second City Training Center, and the two wrote and performed in sketches together more than any other pair in the group. In the troupe's TV show and stage shows, he portrays several popular recurring characters, such as the King of Empty Promises, Sir Simon Milligan, and Jerry Sizzler. A frequent running gag was that McDonald is the least popular member and always struggling not to get kicked out.

When the troupe ended the five-season run of its eponymous television series in 1994, the five members moved to a number of solo projects. McDonald has played roles in movies like Boy Meets Girl, Pleakley in the Lilo & Stitch franchise, and Harry Potter in Epic Movie. On television, he has appeared on The Martin Short Show, Ellen (as a radio personality), That '70s Show (as a confused young cleric, Pastor Dave), Seinfeld, Friends, NewsRadio (on which Foley starred), MADtv, Arrested Development, and Corner Gas. McDonald has also done voice work for various animated series, including Invader Zim (in which he did the voice for Almighty Tallest Purple), The Angry Beavers, Catscratch (in which he voiced Waffle), and Clerks: The Animated Series. He also played an imaginary friend named Ivan in the Foster's Home for Imaginary Friends episode Sight For Sore Eyes, and appeared in the music video for "Roses" by OutKast.

In 2006, McDonald hosted a CBC Television special, Sketch with Kevin McDonald, featuring several of Canada's best-known sketch comedy troupes. The special received two nominations, for the performances by The Minnesota Wrecking Crew and by The Imponderables, for Canadian Comedy Award in the category Best Taped Live Performance, with The Minnesota Wrecking Crew winning the award.

Since 2000, McDonald and the other members of The Kids in the Hall have reunited for a number of tours and televised performances. The troupe played the 2007 Just for Laughs festival, where McDonald also performed his one-and-a half-man show Hammy and the Kids with Craig Northey, based on his two dysfunctional families, his father ("Hammy") and The Kids in the Hall.

Filmography

Film

Television

Video games

Theme parks

Awards and nominations

 1989 - Gemini Award for Best Writing in a Comedy or Variety Program or Series - Won
 1989 - Gemini Award for Best Performance in a Variety or Performing Arts Program or Series - Won
 1990 - Gemini Award for Best Writing in a Comedy or Variety Program or Series - Won
 1992 - Gemini Award for Best Performance in a Comedy Program or Series - Nominated
 1993 - Gemini Award for Best Performance in a Comedy Program or Series - Won
 1993 - Emmy Award for Outstanding Individual Achievement in Writing in a Variety or Music Program - Nominated
 1993 - CableACE Award - Nominated
 1994 - Gemini Award for Best Performance in a Comedy Program or Series - Nominated
 1994 - Emmy Award for Outstanding Individual Achievement in Writing in a Variety or Music Program - Nominated
 1995 - Emmy Award for Outstanding Individual Achievement in Writing in a Variety or Music Program - Nominated
 1995 - Gemini Award for Best Writing in a Comedy or Variety Program or Series - Nominated
 1996 - Gemini Award for Best Writing in a Comedy or Variety Program or Series - Nominated
 1996 - Gemini Award for Best Performance in a Comedy Program or Series - Nominated
 1998 - Silver Hugo Award for Best Documentary - Won
 2003 - Gemini Award for Best Performance or Host in a Variety Program or Series - Nominated

References

External links

 

1961 births
Living people
20th-century Canadian comedians
21st-century Canadian comedians
20th-century Canadian male actors
21st-century Canadian male actors
Anglophone Quebec people
Canadian male film actors
Canadian male television actors
Canadian television personalities
Canadian male voice actors
Comedians from Montreal
Canadian sketch comedians
Male actors from Montreal
Television personalities from Montreal
The Kids in the Hall members
Canadian male comedians